The 2004 Nordea Nordic Light Open was a women's tennis tournament played on outdoor hard courts that was part of the Tier IV category of the 2004 WTA Tour. It was the third edition of the tournament and took place in Stockholm, Sweden from 2 August until 8 August 2004. Third-seeded Alicia Molik won the singles title and earned $22,000 first-prize money.

Finals

Singles

 Alicia Molik defeated  Tatiana Perebiynis, 6–1, 6–1
 It was Molik's 1st singles title of the year and the 2nd of her career.

Doubles

 Alicia Molik /  Barbara Schett defeated  Emmanuelle Gagliardi /  Anna-Lena Grönefeld, 6–3, 6–3

References

External links
 ITF tournament edition details
 Tournament draws

Nordea Nordic Light Open
2004
2004 in Swedish women's sport
2000s in Stockholm
August 2004 sports events in Europe
Nordic